NAD(P) transhydrogenase, mitochondrial is an enzyme that in humans is encoded by the NNT gene on chromosome 5.

The NNT gene contains 26 exons and encodes a transhydrogenase protein that is ~109 kDa in molecular weight and is involved in antioxidant defense in the mitochondria. Two alternatively spliced variants, encoding the same protein, have been found for this gene.

Structure 
Transhydrogenases including NNT can exist in an ‘open’ conformation, where substrates can bind and products can dissociate, in which the dihydronicotinamide and nicotinamide rings are held apart to block hydride transfer. It can exist in an ‘occluded’ conformation, where the substrates are moved into apposition to permit redox chemistry. The protein comprises three subunits (dI, dII and dIII), with the dII component spanning the inner mitochondrial membrane. X-ray crystallography structure of the protein shows that proton pumping is probably coupled to changes in the binding affinities of dIII for NADP(+) and NADPH. The first  motif of dIII contains a Gly-X-Gly-X-X-Ala/Val fingerprint, whereas the nicotinamide ring of NADP(+) is located on a ridge where it can interact with NADH on the dI subunit.

Function 

NAD(P) transhydrogenase, mitochondrial is an integral protein of the inner mitochondrial membrane. The enzyme couples hydride transfer of reducing equivalent between NAD(H) and NADP(+) to proton translocation across the inner mitochondrial membrane. Under most physiological conditions, the enzyme uses energy from the mitochondrial proton gradient to produce high concentrations of NADPH. The resulting NADPH is used for biosynthesis as well as in reactions inside the mitochondria required to remove reactive oxygen species such as to retain a reduced glutathione pool (high GSH/GSSG ratio). The enzyme may be inactivated by oxidative modifications.

Reaction catalyzed:
NADPH + NAD+ = NADP+ + NADH.

Clinical significance 

NAD(P) transhydrogenase, mitochondrial abundance may be associated with human heart failure. In failing hearts, a partial loss of NAD(P) transhydrogenase's mitochondrial activity negatively impacts the NADPH-dependent enzyme activities in the mitochondria and the capacity of mitochondria to maintain proton gradients, which may adversely impact energy production and oxidative stress defense in heart failure and exacerbate oxidative damage to cellular proteins.

Mutations in the NNT gene have been associated to familial glucocorticoid deficiency 1, a severe autosomal recessive disorder in human characterized by insensitivity to adrenocorticotropic hormone action on the adrenal cortex and an inability of the adrenal cortex to produce cortisol Glucocorticoid deficiency 1 usually presents in neonatal to early childhood with episodes of hypoglycemia and other symptoms related to cortisol deficiency, including failure to thrive, recurrent illnesses or infections, convulsions, and shock.  Diagnosis is confirmed with a low plasma cortisol measurement in the presence of an elevated adrenocorticotropic hormone level, and normal aldosterone and plasma renin measurements.

References

Further reading